for the other United States congregations with the same name, see Shearith Israel (disambiguation); for the historic synagogue in New York, see Shearith Israel.

Congregation Shearith Israel (Hebrew: קהילת שארית ישראל דבאלטימאר; nicknamed The Glen Avenue Shul) is a historic synagogue and congregation in Northwest Baltimore, Maryland. Shearith Israel is noteworthy as being the oldest Baltimore congregation to remain Orthodox throughout its history.

History 
Shearith Israel was the second congregation served by Rabbi Abraham Joseph Rice in Baltimore who opened Shearith Israel following his departure from Nidchei Yisrael (known today as The Baltimore Hebrew Congregation). Rice resigned his post in 1849 following the board's decision to reconstitute and adapt certain reforms and their subsequent appointment of Henry Hochheimer. 

Rice founded the first synagogue in 1851 on Howard Street in a rented home; it is unclear whether they had a Minyan during the early years. The congregation was to later move to Greene and Redwood Streets (called German Street then, changed during World War I) after it merged with Congregation Shevet Achim of Eutaw Street in 1879 (the building today is used as Calvary Methodist Episcopal Church South).

McCulloh Street Synagogue 
At approximately 1905, the congregation built the McCulloh Street Synagogue in the American neo-Romanesque style (with Moorish capitals, eastern-Gothic turrets, and a distinctive ocular window at the entrance). This Synagogue was sold, approximately 1935, to become the Zerubabbel Grand Lodge, which it remains today. 

The synagogue was dedicated on September 11, 1903. The McCulloh Street Synagogue closed in 1958. Included in the voting membership was Henry Hartogensis, the prominent orthodox Gabbai and financial officer, who had transferred from Chizuk Amuno

Upper Park Heights Synagogue 
Beginning in 1923, the board in the McCulloh Synagogue appealed for a new building in Upper Park Heights, reflecting on the suburbanization of the Jewish community to streetcar suburbs of Park Heights, Druid Hill, and Garrison. The proposed project was commended for its frugality and conservatism, and was awarded the first mortgage granted to a Synagogue by the Eutaw Savings Bank. Possibly due to the funds saved with the frugal architecture, innovations were put into place such as an improved Mechitzah of curved wrought iron (the McCulloh Street synagogue only had an embankment wall) based on the design of the Hirsch-Breuer Congregation K’hal Adath Jeshurun (known as the Friedberger Anlage, or Synagogue of the Israelitische Religionsgesellschaft). 

A member of the Kehillah, Nathan Adler, fundraised and planned a Mikveh in the building; the size of the structure was approved of by Rabbi Yisrael Meir Kagan, The Chofetz Chaim.

The dedication of the synagogue on Glen and Park Heights avenues (hence the name "The Glen Avenue Synagogue", then the only synagogue on Glen Avenue) took place in 1925, and the speakers were Rabbis Isaiah Levy and Phillip Hillel Klein. 

The constitution of the synagogue required that the only voting members (and those permitted for honors, such as Aliyah and Opening the Ark) were those who were Sabbath observant; despite the new synagogue having 150 members, less than 10 were voting members. This contributed to the breakoff and formation of Beth Jacob Congregation (now defunct) next door.

Rabbis

See also 
History of the Jews in Baltimore 
History of the Jews in the United States 
German Jewry 
Samson Raphael Hirsch and Joseph Breuer - Rabbis of the Kehillah in Frankfurt who fought on behalf of Orthodox Judaism.  
Khal Adath Jeshurun - the "sister synagogue" following the Schwab era; Washington Heights, New York.

References 

Synagogues in Baltimore
Jews and Judaism in Baltimore
1851 establishments in Maryland
Buildings and structures completed in 1925
Buildings and structures in Baltimore